Lee–Shaker is a station stop on the RTA Green Line in Shaker Heights, Ohio, located at the intersection of Lee Road and Shaker Boulevard (Ohio State Route 87).

History
The station opened on December 17, 1913 with the initiation of rail service on what is now Shaker Boulevard from Coventry Road to Fontenay Road. The line was built by Cleveland Interurban Railroad and initially operated by the Cleveland Railway.

In 1980 and 1981, the Green and Blue Lines were completely renovated with new track, ballast, poles and wiring, and new stations were built along the line. The renovated line along Shaker Boulevard opened on October 11, 1980.

On October 17, 2017, a new station was opened at Lee and Shaker, with two new handicapped ramps, and four new shelters.

Station layout
The station comprises two side platforms, the westbound platform west of the intersection, and the eastbound platform east of the intersection, with small shelters on each of the platforms. The platforms are located on the opposite side of the intersection than most other Green Line platforms on Shaker Boulevard because there are left turn lanes on Shaker Boulevard.

References

External links

Green Line (RTA Rapid Transit)
Railway stations in the United States opened in 1913
1913 establishments in Ohio